Slowheart is the third studio album by American country music artist Kip Moore, released on September 8, 2017, through MCA Nashville. The album's lead single, "More Girls Like You", was released on February 10, 2017.

Background and recording
Following the release and touring behind 2015's Wild Ones, Moore took time off to travel, surf and write music. He tells Rolling Stone that Slowheart falls "somewhere between Americana, rock and the evocative storytelling of country."

The album, which Moore produced about 75% of, has less of a "band in the room sound" and more of a vintage, "vocals out front" sound. Moore claims he drew inspiration for the album from Motown music and also '70s classic rock music. The songs "Plead the Fifth" and "The Bull" were not written in any part by Moore, which makes Slowheart Moore's first release to feature songs not written or co-written by him.

Moore said of the album's theme that: The term Slowheart has always been dear to me, but then it finally made sense with this record of coming to grips with my own vulnerabilities, my own hopes, my own stubbornness -- the long journey that it took to get to where I’m at, and the clarity I’m at now. I think for sure this is the most vulnerable I’ve been on a record... the first one is still stuck in that same stubborn place of dealing with the same issues that I’ve faced before, still staying stuck in that spot and not doing anything about it, still feeling that sorrow. Whereas the second half is more hopeful in terms of who I hope to be the next time I’m faced with certain things.

Release

Singles
The lead single from Slowheart, "More Girls Like You", was released on February 10, 2017. The album's release was then preceded by the release of four additional songs to digital outlets and streaming services: "The Bull" (August 11, 2017), "Blonde" (August 18, 2017), "Bittersweet Company" (August 25, 2017) and "Plead the Fifth" (September 1, 2017).

Promotional singles
Four promotional singles were released from the album: "The Bull" on August 11, 2017, "Blonde" on August 18, 2017, "Bittersweet Company" on August 25, 2017, and "Plead the Fifth" on September 1, 2017.

Album
On August 31, 2017, Slowheart was made available to stream in its entirety through NPRs "First Listen" program.

Commercial performance
Slowheart debuted at number three on the Billboard Country Albums chart and number ten on the all-genre US Billboard 200, moving 29,000 equivalent album units; it sold 25,000 copies in its first week, with the remainder of its unit total reflecting the album's streaming activity and track sales. It marks Moore's third straight top ten full-length album, following 2012's Up All Night and 2015's Wild Ones. As of January 2019, the album has sold 56,200 copies in the United States.

Title and artwork
Slowhearts title comes from a nickname given to Moore by a bandmate, referring to the slow pace at which he shows his emotions. Moore's band is also named "The Slowhearts". The album's cover artwork features a photo taken of Moore in Costa Rica, where he found inspiration for the album.

Track listing
Source: Rolling Stone

Personnel
Credits adapted from AllMusic.

Musicians
 Matthew Bubel – drums, percussion
 Tom Bukovac – acoustic guitar, electric guitar
 Dave Cohen – keyboards
 Luke Dick – bass guitar, drums, acoustic guitar, electric guitar, harmonica, keyboards, percussion, programming, background vocals
 David Garcia – bass guitar, drums, electric guitar, keyboards, programming
 Rob McNelly – electric guitar
 Josh Miller – background vocals
 Kip Moore – acoustic guitar, electric guitar, lead vocals, background vocals
 Danny Rader – acoustic guitar, electric guitar
 Jimmie Lee Sloas – bass guitar 
 Dan Tyminski – mandolin
 Erich Wigdahl – drums, percussion

Technical personnel
 Craig Allen – package design
 Sarah Marie Burke – production coordination
 Luke Dick – engineer, producer ("I've Been Around" and "The Bull" only)
 David Garcia – engineering, mixing, producer ("Sunburn", "More Girls Like You", "Blonde", and "Try Again" only)
 Joe LaPorta – mastering
 Jason Lehning – mixing
 Bruce McPeters – cover design
 Kip Moore – art direction, producer (all tracks except "The Bull")
 Dave Salley – engineering, mixing

Charts

Weekly charts

Year-end charts

Release history

References

2017 albums
Kip Moore albums
MCA Records albums